Wesley Ribeiro Silva (born 30 March 1999), simply known as Wesley Ribeiro or simply Wesley, is a Brazilian footballer who plays as a winger for Cruzeiro.

Career statistics

Honours

Club 
Palmeiras
Campeonato Paulista: 2020, 2022
Copa do Brasil: 2020
Copa Libertadores: 2020, 2021
Recopa Sudamericana: 2022
Campeonato Brasileiro Série A: 2022

Individual
 CEE Cup Player of the Tournament: 2018
 The best of de Final of the Copa do Brasil: 2020
Copa do Brasil Team of the Final: 2020

References

External links

1999 births
Living people
Sportspeople from Salvador, Bahia
Brazilian footballers
Association football wingers
Campeonato Brasileiro Série A players
Campeonato Brasileiro Série B players
Sociedade Esportiva Palmeiras players
Esporte Clube Vitória players
Cruzeiro Esporte Clube players